Bluffton High School is a public high school located in Bluffton, Ohio in Allen County, Ohio.  It is the only high school in the Bluffton Exempted Village School District. Bluffton High School's mascot is the pirate.

Academic Performance
Bluffton High School received an Excellent with Distinction rating on their 2007-2008 School Year Report Card as determined by the Ohio Department of Education, met 30 out of 30 state indicators, and received a 104.6 out of possible 120 points on the performance index. Their 2006-07 graduation rate was at 97.8%, had a 22 mean ACT score, and had 19.1% of students graduate with an Honors Diploma.

Notable graduates
 Ralph S. Locher, former mayor of Cleveland, former member of Ohio State Supreme Court

Ohio High School Athletic Association State Championships

 Wrestling - 1981 
 Boys Track and Field - 2008

External links
 District Website
 Athletics Website

Notes and references

High schools in Allen County, Ohio
Educational institutions established in 1871
Public high schools in Ohio
1871 establishments in Ohio
High School